Achladini is a village in the municipal unit of Foloi in the municipality of Archaia Olympia, Elis, Greece. Its population in 2011 was 266.

See also
List of settlements in Elis

References

Populated places in Elis